I Want Crazy is a compilation album by American country music singer Hunter Hayes, first released on April 3, 2015 by Atlantic Records. The album serves as Hayes' international debut studio album. I Want Crazy features songs from Hayes' two studio albums, Hunter Hayes (2011) and Storyline (2014), with two of the songs being re-produced by Ryan Tedder ("I Want Crazy") and Duck Blackwell ("Light Me Up"), respectively. The album entered the UK Albums Chart compiled by the Official Charts Company at number 85 for the week ending June 6, 2015.

Track listing

Notes
 signifies a remixer
 signifies a co-producer

Personnel
 Duck Blackwell - drums, percussion, bass, synthesizer, effects
 Eric Darken - percussion
 Sam Ellis - backing vocals
 Paul Franklin - steel guitar
 Charlie Judge - synthesizer
 Tony Lucido - bass
 Devin Malone - guitar
 Nir Z - drums, percussion
 Steve Sinatra - percussion
 Matt Utterback - bass
 Hunter Hayes - piano, electric guitar, acoustic guitar, resonator guitar, mandolin, bouzouki, accordion, vocals

Charts

Release history

References

2015 compilation albums
Hunter Hayes albums
Atlantic Records compilation albums
Albums produced by Dann Huff